The Song Loulou Power Station is a hydroelectric power plant of the Sanaga River in Cameroon. It has a power generating capacity of  enough to power over 257,100 homes. The Song Loulou power station is built upstream of another power station; the Edea power station. Unlike the Edea power station that mainly power the aluminum smelter located next to it, the Song Loulou power station mainly powers homes and other industrial plants in the South of the country.

See also

 List of power stations in Cameroon
 List of power stations in Africa

References

Song Loulou
Hydroelectric power stations in Cameroon